My Autograph is a 2006 Kannada-language romantic drama film which was directed, produced and enacted by Sudeep in his first directorial venture. Along with him, this film starred Meena, Sridevika, Deepu, and Rashmi Kulkarni. This film is a remake of Tamil film Autograph, which was directed by Cheran.

Plot

The movie begins with Shankar (Sudeep), who runs an advertising agency, boarding a train to visit his native village to invite all of his friends for his wedding. The journey to his childhood days begins there. The happenings in the school, his tussle with his friends, and his first love with his classmate Kamala (Deepu) are all pictured realistically. Shankar reaches the village and invites all including Kamala, who promises to come to the wedding, with her husband and three children.

Then, he goes to Kerala where he had his college education. His major crush at that time was Lathika (Sridevika), a Malayali girl with whom he falls in love, but later the affair proves to be short-lived as her parents marry her off to her cousin Madhavan. On reaching Kerala to invite her, Shankar is shattered to see his lover as a widow.

Meanwhile, he is dejected at the failure of his love affair, and he comes across a trusted friend Divya (Meena), who instills confidence, unearths his hidden talents, and teaches him the lesson that one has to go ahead in life without looking back. However, she does not reveal the tragedy that occurred in her past. As time passes by, she reveals that her mother is a paralytic patient and that she now has to work for survival. While she and Shankar travel on a bus, she reveals that she was in love with someone and believed that he was a good man but got cheated. A poetic narration on the need for a good friend has been stressed.

Towards the end, Shankar marries a girl of his parents' choice: Rashmi (Rashmi Kulkarni). All three girls who had played a part in his life and many college friends attend the wedding. Also, Shankar sets a very nice ending to the main story.

Cast

 Sudeep as Shankar
 Meena as Divya
 Sridevika as Lathika
 Deepu as Kamala
 Rashmi Kulkarni as Rashmi
 Srinivasa Murthy as Shankar's father
 Malathi Sri as Shankar's mother
 Yathiraj as Govinda<ref>[https://www.indiaglitz.com/struggle-is-teacher-in-life--news-20756 Struggle is Teacher in life Indiaglitz]</ref>
 Harish
 Laxmi Narayan
 Vishwanath

Soundtrack
The soundtrack was composed by Bharadwaj who composed the original version, whereas Rajesh Ramanath composed the background score. All the tunes from original were retained. The national-award-winning track "Ovvuru Pookalume" in the Tamil version was reused in this film as "Aralova Hoovugale", and singer K. S. Chithra won Filmfare Award South.

Reception
A critic from Sify said that "Sudeep besides direction has acted very well. His ability from the beginning of career to emote in touching sequences has given him confidence to accept this film that is close to his heart". A critic from Rediff.com'' wrote that "My Autograph is a pleasant film a rarity after the mediocre fare released recently".

Box office
This film got good response from critics, it completed 175 days.

Awards
 53rd Filmfare Awards South
 Best Actor – Kannada → Sudeep –– Nominated 
 Best Actress – Kannada → Meena –– Nominated 
 54th Filmfare Awards South
 Best Female Playback Singer – Kannada → K. S. Chitra – for the song, "Araluva Hoovugale" –– Won

References

External links
 
 
 

2006 films
2000s Kannada-language films
Kannada remakes of Tamil films
Indian romantic drama films
Films shot in Alappuzha
Films scored by Bharadwaj (composer)
2006 directorial debut films
2006 romantic drama films